The Perunui River is a short river of the Northland Region of New Zealand's North Island. It is one of the many feeder rivers of the Hokianga Harbour system.

See also
List of rivers of New Zealand

References

Hokianga
Rivers of the Northland Region
Rivers of New Zealand